These are the results of the men's doubles competition, one of two events for male competitors in table tennis at the 2000 Summer Olympics in Sydney.

Among 36 entries, eight seeded pairs were allocated into the draw of knockout stage which started from the round of 16. The rest 28 pairs were reduced to 24 pairs by four knockout matches. 24 pairs competed in eight groups of three pairs per group. Winners of each group advanced to the knockout stage.

Seeds
  (final, silver medalists)
  (champions, gold medalists)
  (quarterfinals)
  (semifinals, bronze medalists)
  (quarterfinals)
  (first round)
  (quarterfinals)
  (semifinals, fourth place)

Qualification round
The winners of each qualification match advanced to the group stage.

Group stage

Group A

Group B

Group C

Group D

Group E

Group F

Group G

Group H

Knockout stage

Competitors

References

External links
 Table Tennis. Official Report of the XXVII Olympiad - Results. Digitally published by the LA84 Foundation.
 2000 Summer Olympics / Table Tennis / Doubles, Men. Olympedia.

Table tennis at the 2000 Summer Olympics
Men's events at the 2000 Summer Olympics